The Old River Bridge is a historic bridge spanning the Saline River near Benton in Saline County, Arkansas. Now closed to traffic, it formerly carried River Street in Benton across the river south of the city. It is a two-span through truss bridge, mounted on cylindrical concrete columns. It was built in 1889 along the route of the historic military road through the area, and is one of the state's oldest surviving bridges. It was taken out of service in 1974.

As of April 2020 the bridge has been taken down and will be rebuilt as part of the project to put a multi-use trail from Little Rock to Hot Springs on the path of the old Southwest Trail.

The bridge was listed on the National Register of Historic Places in 1977.

See also
List of bridges documented by the Historic American Engineering Record in Arkansas
List of bridges on the National Register of Historic Places in Arkansas
National Register of Historic Places listings in Saline County, Arkansas

References

External links

Road bridges on the National Register of Historic Places in Arkansas
Bridges completed in 1889
Historic American Engineering Record in Arkansas
National Register of Historic Places in Saline County, Arkansas
Truss bridges in the United States
1889 establishments in Arkansas
Relocated buildings and structures in Arkansas
Transportation in Saline County, Arkansas